Sabretooth or sabertooth may refer to:

Animals 
 Saber-toothed cat, several prehistoric felines
 Smilodon, a prehistoric genus of cat
 Sabertooth fish, a deep-sea fish found in the tropics
 Sabre-toothed blenny, Aspidontus taeniatus, a variety of fish that lives deep underwater in the benthic zone
 Sabertooth blenny, Plagiotremus azaleus, a species of combtooth blenny in coral reefs in the eastern Pacific Ocean
 Sabertooth salmon, Oncorhynchus rastrosus, an ancient species of salmon
 Sabretooth tetra, the Payara, Hydrolycus scomberoides, a species of gamefish in the Orinoco River in Venezuela and in the Amazon basin
 Saber-toothed predator, several distantly related lineages of synapsids
 Thylacosmilus, a genus of sabre-toothed metatherian predators from the Miocene period
Gorgonopsia, an extinct group of sabre-tooth therapsids from the Middle and Late Permian

Sports 
 Sabretooth (mascot), the mascot for the Buffalo Sabres National Hockey League team

Fiction 
 Sabretooth (character), a Marvel Comics supervillain
 Sabretooth (film), a 2002 made-for-TV movie
 Sabre-Tooth, a 1966 book by Peter O'Donnell featuring the character Modesty Blaise
 Captain Sabertooth, a series of stage plays, theatrical films, and a television series by the Norwegian singer and actor Terje Formoe

Other uses 
 SABERTOOTH, a protein sequence and structure alignment algorithm
 Sabertooth Games, a now defunct Memphis, Tennessee based game company, founded in 2001

See also
 Sabercat (disambiguation)

Animal common name disambiguation pages